Sarga stipoidea is a species of flowering plant in the grass family Poaceae, native to seasonally dry tropical areas of northern and central Australia.

References

Andropogoneae
Endemic flora of Australia
Flora of Western Australia
Flora of the Northern Territory
Flora of Queensland
Plants described in 1911